Elizabeth Walker (or variants) may refer to:

Entertainers
Betty Walker (1928–1982), Jewish-American comic and actress
Tippy Walker (born 1947), née Elizabeth Tipton Walker, American actress
Helen Roberts (1912–2010), aka Betty Walker, English singer and actress

Politicians
Liz Walker (politician)
Liz Walker, political candidate for Newton—North Delta

Sports
Elisabeth Walker-Young, or Elisabeth Walker, swimmer who represented Canada at the 2004 Summer Paralympics
Elizabeth Walker (sailor) who represented Bermuda at the 1995 Pan American Games

Others
Elizabeth Walker, corps de ballet at New York City Ballet
Elizabeth Walker (author), American author of romance novels
Elizabeth Harrison Walker (1897–1955), American lawyer and publisher
Liz Walker (journalist), on WBZ-TV
Elizabeth Walker (artist) (1800–1876), British engraver and portrait-painter
Elizabeth Walker (pharmacist) (1623–1690), British druggist
Elizabeth A. Walker, American diabetes nurse scientist

See also
Elizabeth Pupo-Walker, percussionist with Tuatara
Beth Walker (disambiguation)
Eliza Walker (disambiguation)
Lisa Walker (disambiguation)
Walker (surname)